George Greville may refer to:

George Greville, 2nd Earl of Warwick (1746–1816), British nobleman and politician
George Greville, 4th Earl of Warwick (1818–1893), English politician, bibliophile and collector
Sir George Greville (diplomat) (1851–1937), British diplomat
George Greville (tennis) (1868–1958), English tennis player